Sanya Mateyas is a Croatian–American actress and singer. She moved to the United States in 1999.

She was a leader and a composer for her Los Angeles-based hard-rock band Duda Did It, with an independent album released in 2008.

Other than her appearance in Disney's Holes, she has played in some short subjects and had numerous TV appearances. She was also a singer for Trans-Siberian Orchestra.

Biography
Mateyas was born in Zagreb, Croatia. She moved to the US in 1999. She is the sister of Tajči, a Croatian-American singer and former pop-star in ex-Yugoslavia.

Filmography

Singing career
In 2004, Sanya Mateyas was one of the composers and performers in I Thirst: The Crucifixion Story, a live performance recorded to DVD, which was inspired by Jesus' crucifixion. The other artists included her sister.

References

External links

Croatian actresses
21st-century Croatian women singers
Croatian film actresses
Croatian pop singers
Croatian musical theatre actors
Croatian emigrants to the United States
Living people
Year of birth missing (living people)
Musicians from Zagreb